Survival of the fittest is a metaphor related to the biological theory of evolution.

Survival of the Fittest may also refer to:

Books
 Survival of the Fittest (novel), by Jonathan Kellerman, 1997
Survival of the Fittest, a book by Mike Stroud, 1998
Survival of the Fittest, a book in The Hardy Boys Casefile Series, 1997

Music
 Survival of the Fittest (The Headhunters album), 1975
 Survival of the Fittest Live, a live album, or the title song, by The Amboy Dukes, 1971
 "Survival of the Fittest" (song), by Mobb Deep, 1995
 "Survival of the Fittest", a song by Fredo, 2019
 "Survival of the Fittest", a song by Herbie Hancock from Maiden Voyage, 1965
 "Survival of the Fittest", a song by MC Lyte from Eyes on This, 1989

Television
 Survival of the Fittest (TV series) a British reality series
 ROH Survival of the Fittest, an annual professional wrestling tournament held by Ring of Honor

Episodes
 "Survival of the Fittest" (The Spectacular Spider-Man)
 "Survival of the Fittest", an episode of The Six Million Dollar Man
 "Survival of the Fittest" (Supernatural)
 "Survival of the Fittest", an episode of the Japanese documentary series Miracle Planet
 "Survival of the Fittest", an episode on the television series The 100

Other uses
 Survival of the Fittest (Judges Guild), a 1979 role-playing game adventure
 Survival of the Fittest & Klein’s Story, a pair of audio dramas based on the television series Doctor Who